Urmas Rooba (born 8 July 1978 in Kaaruka) is a retired Estonian footballer, who last played for Paide Linnameeskond in Meistriliiga. He played the position of defender.

Club career
Rooba played for FC Midtjylland before he joined FC København. He was injury plagued at the Danish capital, and moved to Vejle Boldklub in 2006, but because of his injuries he waited until 20 May 2007 to make his debut for the first team. In his FC Midtjylland days was touted as one of the best defenders in the Danish league, before injury after injury has put his playing career on a downfall.

He has also played in FC Lelle, Lelle SK, JK Tervis Pärnu and TPS.

International career
He has made 70 appearances for Estonian national team and has scored 1 goal.

Personal
Rooba is the brother of former Estonian international Meelis Rooba, who made 50 caps for the national team between 1996 and 2004.

References
Guardian Football

External links
 
 
 

1978 births
Living people
Sportspeople from Paide
Estonian footballers
Estonia international footballers
Meistriliiga players
Danish Superliga players
Veikkausliiga players
FC Flora players
FC Midtjylland players
F.C. Copenhagen players
Vejle Boldklub players
FF Jaro players
Association football fullbacks
Estonian expatriate footballers
Turun Palloseura footballers
Expatriate men's footballers in Denmark
Estonian expatriate sportspeople in Denmark
Expatriate footballers in Finland
Estonian expatriate sportspeople in Finland
Paide Linnameeskond players